The United States Air Force Combat Diver Course—administratively known as the 350th Battlefield Airmen Training Squadron, Det 2—is held at the Navy Diving Salvage and Training Center, Naval Support Activity Panama City and trains Pararescuemen, Combat Rescue Officers, Combat Controllers, and Special Tactics Officers to conduct and participate in special operations diving missions.

During the course, students are trained to conduct Personnel Recovery and special operations diving missions.  However, the primary focus of the USAF Combat Diver Course is to develop special operations Airmen into competent, capable, and safe combat divers/swimmers.  This course provides diver training through classroom instruction, extensive physical training, surface and subsurface water confidence pool exercises, pool familiarization dives, day/night tactical open water surface/subsurface infiltration swims, open circuit/closed circuit diving procedures and underwater search and recovery procedures.

Graduates of the course are authorized by the USAF to wear the diving badge on their utility and dress uniforms.

History of USAF Combat Diving

Pararescue
The earliest operations that required USAF personnel to conduct subsurface diving were those conducted by Pararescuemen (PJs) assigned to the Aerospace Rescue and Recovery Service (ARRS) mission. As early as the 1960s, Corona Satellite payload recoveries frequently necessitated "parascuba" jumps, where rescue personnel would parachute into the open ocean with scuba equipment on in order to secure the sensitive information before it sank. As uncrewed space missions increased and evolved to crewed space flight, Pararescue personnel provided rescue and recovery support to many NASA programs, such as the Mercury, Gemini, Apollo, and Space Shuttle missions.

Until 1974 all PJs attended US Navy dive training but changing standards in Navy dive training led the community to migrate to the US Army Special Forces Combat Diver course. Attendance continued until the formation of the USAF Combat Dive Course in 2006.

From these origins, diving became a standard part of Pararescue Civil and Combat Search and Rescue capabilities. Sub-surface personnel and sensitive item recoveries continue to be performed by PJs around the world and  diving capabilities are maintained by those assigned to Special Tactics Squadrons.

Combat Control
While select Combat Control (CCT) personnel that worked with sister service combat dive teams attained diving qualifications as early as 1973, dive training did not become a standard part of the CCT skillset until the 1980s. Though some CCT divers did attend the dive portion of BUDS in the 1970s, most CCT divers attended either the U.S. Army Combat Diver Qualification Course or the Marine Corps Combatant Diver Course until the USAF opened its own course in 2006

Lineage
Before the Battlefield Training Group was activated on 2 June 2016, the USAF Combat Dive Course was administratively known as the 342nd Training Squadron, Det 2

References 

United States Air Force military education and training
United States Air Force Special Operations Command
 United States Air Force